Shestan Olya (also Romanized as Shestān ‘Olyā; also known as Shastān-e Bālā, Shāshtū, Shastān, and Shishtu) is a village in Safaiyeh Rural District, in the Central District of Zaveh County, Razavi Khorasan Province, Iran. At the 2006 census, its population was 88, in 23 families.

References 

Populated places in Zaveh County